Sharla Cheung Man (born 7 February 1968) is a Hong Kong actress and film producer.

Career 
Cheung was discovered by Wong Jing, who cast her in her first film role in the 1986 film The Magic Crystal. She continued to work with the director on many of his productions in the early 1990s as well. Cheung gained popularity with the numerous films she starred in alongside Stephen Chow, in which she was frequently cast as Chow's love interest after winning the Miss Asia contest. They partnered for more than 10 films from 1988 to 1994, including All for the Winner, God of Gamblers II, Fist of Fury 1991, Fight Back to School, Royal Tramp, and King of Beggars. Another frequent co-star is Andy Lau, who appeared alongside Cheung in such films as God of Gamblers, God of Gamblers II, and Lee Rock.

Cheung finished from the acting school after middle school.

After an impressive body of work in the early 1990s (she starred in about 50 films between 1990 and 1995), Cheung became a film producer in 1995 with Dream Lover (starring Tony Leung Ka-fai and Wu Chien-lien). However, Cheung was unhappy with it and she remade the film as Romantic Dream (starring Cheung and Lau Ching-wan). Both versions opened in 1995. The films, however, were commercial failures, and Cheung then retired from the film industry to focus on various business interests.

Cheung made a comeback in acting in the early 2000s to star in several television series. She appeared in such TV series as My Celebrity Boyfriend in 2003 and Legend of the Book's Tower in 2005 alongside Nicky Wu. In 2002, she portrayed Diaochan, one of the Four Beauties of ancient China, opposite Ray Lui, in the television series Diao Chan.

Filmography (as actress)

Filmography (as producer)

References

External links
Sharla Cheung Man at the Hong Kong Movie Database
 
 Full filmography at HK Cinemagic
  Sharla Cheung at the Chinese Movie Database

1968 births
Living people
Hong Kong film actresses
Hong Kong film producers